Pi is a small village belonging to the municipality of Bellver de Cerdanya, in the comarca of Cerdanya, vegueria of Alt Pirineu i Aran (Catalonia).

References 

Populated places in Cerdanya (comarca)